Vasco de Jesus Oliveira (born 18 March 1922 - deceased), former Portuguese footballer who played as defender.

Football career 

Oliveira gained 2 caps for Portugal and made his debut 25 May 1947 in Lisbon against England, in a 0-10 defeat.

External links 
 * 
Stats at Eu-Football

1922 births
Portuguese footballers
Association football defenders
Primeira Liga players
C.F. Os Belenenses players
Portugal international footballers
Year of death missing